The OPPO F7 is a phablet smartphone based on Android 8.1, which was unveiled on March 26, 2018. The model has a 25MP front camera and a 16MP rear camera.

References 

Android (operating system) devices
Mobile phones introduced in 2018
Oppo smartphones